Maxim Valeryevich Belyh or Maksim Walerýewiç Belyh (also written as Maxim Valeryevich Belykh; born 7 August 1984) is a former professional Turkmen football player, currently working as assistant coach in Kaganat.

Club career 
At the end of the 2014 season left from FC Ahal. In 2015 played for FC Shagadam.

The last club of his career was FC Ahal.

International career 
He made his senior debut for Turkmenistan in 2010 FIFA World Cup qualification (AFC) match against Jordan on 23 March 2008.

Coaching career 
From 2017 to 2019, he worked as an assistant coach at FC Ahal.

In May 2019, he entered the coaching staff of the Turkmenistan national football team under the leadership of Ante Miše. In 2020, he took a position of physical coach in the  Turkmenistan national futsal team.

In 2022, Belykh joined the coaching staff of the Kyrgyz Premier League club Kaganat.

Personal life 
Belyh is an ethnic Russian.

References

External links
 
 

Turkmenistan footballers
Living people
1984 births
Turkmenistan expatriate footballers
Turkmenistan expatriate sportspeople in Uzbekistan
Expatriate footballers in Uzbekistan
Navbahor Namangan players
Sportspeople from Ashgabat
Turkmenistan international footballers
Association football defenders
Footballers at the 2010 Asian Games
Asian Games competitors for Turkmenistan
Turkmenistan people of Russian descent